The 1991 Scottish Challenge Cup final, also known as the B&Q Cup final for sponsorship reasons, was an association football match between Hamilton Academical and Ayr United on 8 December 1991 at Fir Park in Motherwell. It was the second final of the Scottish Challenge Cup, and a continuation of the tournament organised the previous season to celebrate the centenary of the Scottish Football League. 

The match was Hamilton Academical's first national final in 56 years since the Scottish Cup final of 1935; whilst it was Ayr United's second consecutive appearance in the final of the tournament having lost the inaugural final the previous season. The tournament was contested by clubs below the Scottish Premier Division, with both finalists from the First Division. The only goal of the match came from Colin Harris for Hamilton Academical to win 1–0.

Route to the final

Hamilton Academical 

Hamilton Academical entered the first round with 20 other clubs from the First and Second Divisions; six clubs received random byes into the second round. The club was drawn against Alloa Athletic in the first round at home and won 5–1 at Douglas Park. In the next round Hamilton Academical travelled to Partick Thistle where they won 2–1 to progress to the quarter-finals. With eight clubs left in the competition, Hamilton faced East Fife away from home and won 3–2 to qualify for the semi-finals where they played Raith Rovers at Douglas Park to win 2–1 and progress to the final; their first national final since 1935.

Ayr United 

In the first round Ayr United played Dundee in a repeat of the previous season's final, which the club lost 3–2 after extra time. This time Ayr United won the match 2–0 at Dens Park to progress to the second round. The next round was a match at Ochilview Park to face Stenhousemuir where it ended 2–0 to Ayr United. With eight clubs left in the competition, the club played Stranraer at Somerset Park and won 2–0 for the third consecutive round and progress to the semi-final. The draw for the semi-final paired the club with Queen of the South which Ayr United won 3–2 to reach the final of the tournament for the second year in a row.

Pre-match

Analysis 
Both Ayr United and Hamilton Academical played two games each at their respective homes of Somerset Park and Douglas Park, and two away games in the rounds preceding the final. Ayr United scored a total of nine goals and conceded only two before the final, compared with Hamilton Academical's twelve goals scored and five conceded. Ayr United kept a total of three clean sheets whilst Hamilton Academical kept none. This was the first appearance for Hamilton in the Scottish Challenge Cup final, whereas Ayr United had been defeated in final of the previous season in the competition's inaugural year.

Match

Summary

Details

References 

1991
Challenge Cup Final
Ayr United F.C. matches
Hamilton Academical F.C. matches
December 1991 sports events in the United Kingdom